Dorkfish is a 1998 comedy album by comedian Bill Engvall. It was released in 1998 via Warner Bros. Records. The album includes a novelty Christmas song titled "Here's Your Sign Christmas," which charted at #39 on Hot Country Songs in 1998 and #46 in 1999. "I'm a Cowboy," another musical track, peaked at #60 on the same chart.

Track listing

"Factory Outlet Malls" (1:38)
"Flying" (3:35)
"Smokers" (1:57)
"Weather and News" (4:14)
"Bungee Jumping and Parachuting" (5:12)
"My Daughter's Growing Up" (2:32)
"T-Ball and Indian Guides" (8:03)
"Minivan" (1:43)
"Discovery Channel" (3:28)
"Dorkfish" (2:00)
"Whale Watching" (2:06)
"Broke Food" (2:56)
"More Here's Your Sign" (3:15)
"Bronco Busting" (4:49)
"Deer Hunting" (4:34)
"I'm a Cowboy" (song) (3:17)
"Here's Your Sign Christmas" (song) (2:19)

Charts

Weekly charts

Year-end charts

References

Bill Engvall live albums
Stand-up comedy albums
1998 live albums
Warner Records live albums
1990s comedy albums